Old Fletton was an urban district in the county of Huntingdonshire and then (from 1965) Huntingdon and Peterborough. The urban district was abolished in 1974 under the Local Government Act 1972, and now forms part of the city of Peterborough in Cambridgeshire.

The urban district was created in 1905, incorporating the parishes of:
Fletton (otherwise Fletton Rural or Old Fletton; Fletton Urban or New Fletton was placed in the Municipal Borough of Peterborough in 1894)
Stanground South (Stanground North being transferred to Thorney Rural District)
Woodston (otherwise Woodston Rural; Woodston Urban was placed in the Municipal Borough of Peterborough in 1894)

References 

History of Huntingdonshire
History of Peterborough
Politics of Peterborough
Districts of England abolished by the Local Government Act 1972
Districts of England created by the Local Government Act 1894
Urban districts of England